Knut Werner Hansen (born 22 November 1951) is a Norwegian politician for the Labour Party.

He served as a deputy representative to the Parliament of Norway from Troms during the terms 1997–2001, 2001–2005 and 2005–2009. In total he met during 1 year and 46 days of parliamentary session.

He was born in Skjervøy. He was a member of Karlsøy municipal council, and from 2011 county mayor of Troms.

References

1951 births
Living people
Deputy members of the Storting
Chairmen of County Councils of Norway
Labour Party (Norway) politicians
Troms politicians
People from Skjervøy